Arkadiusz Piotr Sobkowiak (born 30 March 1973) is a Polish rower. He competed in the men's coxless four event at the 2000 Summer Olympics.

References

External links
 
 
 

1973 births
Living people
Polish male rowers
Olympic rowers of Poland
Rowers at the 2000 Summer Olympics
People from Strzelno
Sportspeople from Kuyavian-Pomeranian Voivodeship